The 2019 Ladies Open Lausanne was a women's tennis tournament played on outdoor clay courts. It was the 27th edition of the tournament (the first to be held in Lausanne), and part of the International category of the 2019 WTA Tour. It took place at Tennis Club Stade-Lausanne in Lausanne, Switzerland, from 15 July through 21 July 2019.

Points and prize money

Point distribution

Prize money

Singles main draw entrants

Seeds

 1 Rankings are as of 1 July 2019.

Other entrants
The following players received wildcards into the main draw:
  Ylena In-Albon
  Tess Sugnaux 
  Simona Waltert

The following players received entry from the qualifying draw:
  Giulia Gatto-Monticone
  Varvara Gracheva
  Barbara Haas 
  Allie Kiick  
  Jasmine Paolini
  Anastasia Potapova

The following players received entry as lucky losers:
  Han Xinyun
  Kristína Kučová

Withdrawals
  Ekaterina Alexandrova → replaced by  Natalia Vikhlyantseva
  Kateryna Kozlova → replaced by  Han Xinyun
  Mandy Minella → replaced by  Kristína Kučová
  Karolína Muchová → replaced by  Martina Trevisan
  Evgeniya Rodina → replaced by  Mandy Minella
  Lesia Tsurenko → replaced by  Conny Perrin
  Zhang Shuai → replaced by  Antonia Lottner

Retirements
  Julia Görges (right forearm injury)

Doubles main draw entrants

Seeds

1 Rankings are as of 1 July 2019.

Other entrants 
The following pairs received wildcards into the doubles main draw:
  Ylena In-Albon /  Conny Perrin 
  Tess Sugnaux /  Simona Waltert

Withdrawals 
  Pauline Parmentier (viral illness)

Champions

Singles 

  Fiona Ferro def.  Alizé Cornet 6–1, 2–6, 6–1

Doubles 

  Anastasia Potapova /  Yana Sizikova def.  Monique Adamczak /  Han Xinyun, 6–2, 6–4

References

External links 
 

Ladies Open Lausanne
Ladies Open Lausanne
WTA Swiss Open
Ladies Open Lausanne
ladies